
Restaurant Christophe is a defunct restaurant in Amsterdam, in the Netherlands. It was a fine dining restaurant that was awarded one Michelin star in 1989 and retained that rating until 2006.

In 2013, Gault Millau awarded the restaurant 14 out of 20 points.

The star was gained under the leadership of the head chef Christophe Royer The last head chef is Jean-Joel Bonsens.

Jean-Joel Bonsens and his business partner-sommelier Ellen Mansfield took over the restaurant in 2006. They closed down the restaurant in June 2014.

See also
List of Michelin starred restaurants in the Netherlands

References 

Restaurants in Amsterdam
Michelin Guide starred restaurants in the Netherlands
Defunct restaurants in the Netherlands